Azouz Synagogue is a synagogue in Alexandria, Egypt. It is one of the oldest synagogues in Alexandria. It is unknown when it was built, but it was rebuilt in 1853.

See also
History of the Jews in Egypt
List of synagogues in Egypt

References

Synagogues in Alexandria